Raphael Bernard Wilson (born August 17, 1970) is a former American football defensive tackle in the National Football League. He was signed by the Detroit Lions as an undrafted free agent in 1992. He played college football at Tennessee State.

Wilson also played for the Tampa Bay Buccaneers and Arizona Cardinals.

1970 births
Living people
American football defensive tackles
Tennessee State Tigers football players
Detroit Lions players
Tampa Bay Buccaneers players
Arizona Cardinals players